The following highways are numbered 200:

Australia
 Henty Highway (Victoria)
 - Western Australia

Canada
 Manitoba Provincial Road 200

Costa Rica
 National Route 200

India
  National Highway 200 (India)

Japan
 Japan National Route 200

Mexico
 Mexican Federal Highway 200

Turkey
 , a west-east state road in Turkey running from Çanakkale to Refahiye, Erzincan Province.

United States
 Alabama State Route 200
 Arkansas Highway 200
 California State Route 200
 Connecticut Route 200
 Florida State Road 200
 Georgia State Route 200
 Hawaii Route 200
 Idaho State Highway 200
 Iowa Highway 200 (former)
 Kentucky Route 200
 Maine State Route 200
 Maryland Route 200
 M-200 (Michigan highway) (former)
 Minnesota State Highway 200
 Montana Highway 200
 Montana Highway 200S
 New Mexico State Road 200
 New York State Route 200
 North Carolina Highway 200
 North Dakota Highway 200
 Oregon Route 200
 South Carolina Highway 200
 Tennessee State Route 200
 Texas State Highway 200
 Texas State Highway Spur 200
 Farm to Market Road 200 (Texas)
 Utah State Route 200
 Virginia State Route 200

Territories:
 Puerto Rico Highway 200
 Puerto Rico Highway 200R